Fariza Aldangorova (born 28 June 1996) is a Kazakhstani taekwondo practitioner. In 2018, she won one of the bronze medals in the women's 53 kg event at the 2018 Asian Games held in Jakarta, Indonesia.

In 2013, she won the silver medal in the girls' 55 kg event at the 2013 Asian Youth Games held in Nanjing, China. In the final she lost against Pauline Lopez of the Philippines.

In 2014, she competed in the women's 53 kg event at the 2014 Asian Games held in Incheon, South Korea without advancing far. She was eliminated in her first match by Sousan Hajipour of Iran.

References

External links 
 

Living people
1996 births
Place of birth missing (living people)
Kazakhstani female taekwondo practitioners
Taekwondo practitioners at the 2014 Asian Games
Taekwondo practitioners at the 2018 Asian Games
Medalists at the 2018 Asian Games
Asian Games bronze medalists for Kazakhstan
Asian Games medalists in taekwondo